The Annie Award for Best Production Design in an Animated Feature Production is an Annie Award first presented in 1994. Since then, it is annually awarded to the animation industry's best or excellent work performed in the areas of overall production design and art direction for sets of animated feature films.

Winners and nominees

1990s
Best Individual Achievement for Artistic Excellence in the Field of Animation

Best Individual Achievement for Production Design in the Field of Animation

2000s

2010s

2020s

Multiple wins 
3 wins

 Ralph Eggleston

2 wins

 Michael Giaimo
 Harley Jessup
 Pierre-Olivier Vincent

See also
 Art Directors Guild Award for Excellence in Production Design for a Animated Film

References

External links 
 Annie Awards: Legacy

Annie Awards
Awards for best art direction